Barbara Ertl (born 27 January 1982) is an Italian biathlete. She competed in two events at the 2006 Winter Olympics. She lives in Sand in Taufers, Italy.

References

1982 births
Living people
Biathletes at the 2006 Winter Olympics
Italian female biathletes
Olympic biathletes of Italy